Utopiayile Rajavu is a 2015 Malayalam satirical comedy film directed by Kamal and penned by PS Rafeeque. It stars Mammootty, Sethulakshmi, Jewel Mary, KPAC Lalitha, Janardhanan, TG Ravi, Joy Mathew, Sudheer Karamana, Nandu and Indrans. Ouseppachan composed the soundtrack. The film released on 27 August 2015.

Plot 
The film follows the life of CP Swathanthryan, son of freedom fighter Chembakassery Parameswaran Pillai. His uncle, Soman Thampi, is a crook who envies CP's wealth and is a constant troublemaker for him. He is determined to win the legal suit filed by CP. Losing it would result in reinstating the wealth he forcibly obtained. CP wants to be famous at any cost, which triggers hilarious events. After many incidents, he realizes that one should not chase fame; fame should chase us based on our deeds. The rest of the story deals with how he brings justice to people to whom it was denied and delayed.

Cast

 Mammootty as C.P Swathanthran
 Jewel Mary as Umadevi
 Sunil Sukhada as Soman Thampi
 Joy Mathew as Chembakasseri Parameshwaran Pillai
 S. P. Sreekumar as Pindani
 Tini Tom as Statue of Jesus Christ
Salim Kumar as (Voice of) Crow
 Indrans as Velappan
 Janardhanan as Vasavan Pillai
 KPAC Lalitha as Narayani
 Noby Marcose as Kattappuram Kuttappan
 Sudheer Karamana as SI Purushothaman
 Sadiq  as Ramakrishnan
 Jayaraj Warrier as Markandeyan
 Sasi Kalinga  as Murari
 Sethulakshmi as Januvamma
 Pradeep Kottayam as Poornachandran
Nandhu as Nadar
Manju Sunichan as Saritha
Munshi Venu as Velayudhan
Mukunthan as Home Minister
Jayaprakash Kuloor as Sakhavu Theekkoyi
Sneha Sreekumar as Thankamani
Vijayan Paringodu as Advocate Thirumunbu
Surabhi Lakshmi as Zaira Bhanu
Jayashankar Karimuttam as Chachappan
Anoop Chandran as Advocate
MG Sasi as Advocate
Jayan Cherthala as Sudhakaran Pillai
Majeed as Advocate
Muhammed Perambra as Aboobacker
Naseer Sankranthi as Danger Dasappan
KTC Abdulla as Sairabhanu's father
Sumathi as police

Production
Kamal directed. PS Rafeeque approached Mammootty with the script on the set of Bhaskar The Rascal. The actor immediately accepted and suggested Kamal as director. Kamal, too, committed to the project. Kamal said, "Animals, birds and even statues will voice their opinion in Utopiayile Rajavu,". Mammootty also recommended Jewel Mary for the heroine.

The film launched in Kochi on 18 May 2015 during which sewing machines were donated to women from tribal communities. The shoot started at Thodupuzha, Kerala, in May 2015. The film was shot in Trivandrum.

Soundtrack 
The music was composed by Ouseppachan and lyrics were written by P. S. Rafeeque. The audio launch was held at Ernakulam on 2 August 2015. The first song released was "Uppinu Pona Vazhiyethu".

References

External links
 
 

2015 films
2010s Malayalam-language films
Films directed by Kamal (director)
Films scored by Ouseppachan
Films shot in Thiruvananthapuram